Gugang Town is a rural town in Liuyang City, Hunan Province, People's Republic of China. The town is bordered to the north by Fushoushan Town of Pingjiang County, to the east by Yanxi Town, to the southeast by Yonghe Town, to the west by Chunkou Town and Guankou subdistrict, to the south by Gaoping Town, and to the northwest by Shegang Town.

History
In 2015, the former Gugang Town and Sankou Town merged to form the new Gugang Town.

Administrative division
The town is divided into 12 villages and four communities, the following areas: 
 Taoyuan Community
 Gugang Community
 Gucheng Community
 Guojiating Community
 Fanshi Village
 Xianzhou Village
 Mianjiang Village
 Meitianhu Village
 Jinyuan Village
 Xinyuan Village
 Yangang Village
 Huacheng Village
 Baogaisi Village
 Bailu Village
 Huaxiang Village
 Dongying Village

Geography
Mountains located adjacent to and visible from the townsite are: Mount Xiangluguan and Mount Hanpo'ao.

Liuyang River, also known as the mother river, flows through the town.

The town has two reservoirs: Guojiachong Reservoir and Meitian Reservoir.

Economy
The economy is supported primarily by farming and ranching.

Education
Gugang Middle School is the only junior highschool in Gugang. Besides, the No.3 senior highschool of Liuyang is settled here.

Transportation

Expressway
The Changsha–Liuyang Expressway, from Changsha, running west to east through the town to Jiangxi.

Provincial Highway
The Provincial Highway S309 passes across the town west to east.

Attractions
Huanglongxia Rafting is a famous scenic spot in the town.

References

Divisions of Liuyang
Liuyang